74th NBR Awards
December 4, 2002

Best Film: 
 The Hours 
The 74th National Board of Review Awards, honoring the best in filmmaking in 2002, were announced on 4 December 2002 and given on 14 January 2003.

Top 10 films
The Hours
Chicago
Gangs of New York
The Quiet American
Adaptation.
Rabbit-Proof Fence
The Pianist
Far from Heaven
Thirteen Conversations About One Thing
Frida

Top Foreign Films
Talk to Her
Y Tu Mamá También
8 Women
City of God
El crimen del Padre Amaro

Winners
Best Film:
The Hours
Best Foreign Language Film:
Hable con ella (Talk to Her), Spain
Best Actor:
Campbell Scott – Roger Dodger
Best Actress:
Julianne Moore – Far from Heaven
Best Supporting Actor:
Chris Cooper – Adaptation.
Best Supporting Actress:
Kathy Bates – About Schmidt
Best Cast:
Nicholas Nickleby
Breakthrough Performance – Male:
Derek Luke – Antwone Fisher
Breakthrough Performance – Female:
Maggie Gyllenhaal – Secretary
Best Director:
Phillip Noyce – The Quiet American and Rabbit-Proof Fence
Best Debut Director:
Rob Marshall – Chicago
Best Screenplay:
Charlie Kaufman – Adaptation., Confessions of a Dangerous Mind and Human Nature
Best Documentary Feature:
Bowling for Columbine
Best Animated Feature:
Sen to Chihiro no Kamikakushi (Spirited Away)
Best Film Made For Cable TV:
The Laramie Project
Career Achievement Award:
Christopher Plummer
Special Award for Visionary Cinematic Achievement:
George Lucas
Special Filmmaking Achievement:
George Clooney, Confessions of a Dangerous Mind
Career Achievement – Music Composition:
Elmer Bernstein
Career Achievement – Cinematography:
Conrad Hall
Humanitarian Award:
Sheila Nevins (HBO)
William K. Everson Award For Film History:
Annette Insdorf, Films and the Holocaust
Freedom Of Expression:
Rabbit-Proof Fence
Ararat
Bloody Sunday
The Grey Zone
Special Recognition For Excellence In Filmmaking:
Frailty
The Good Girl
The Guys
Heaven
Igby Goes Down
Max
Personal Velocity: Three Portraits
Real Women Have Curves
Roger Dodger
Sunshine State
Tadpole
Tully

External links
National Board of Review of Motion Pictures :: Awards for 2002

2002
2002 film awards
2002 in American cinema